Lenox Park Historic District, also known as Columbia Park, is a national historic district located at Hendersonville, Henderson County, North Carolina.  The district encompasses 42 contributing buildings and 1 contributing structure in a predominantly residential section of Hendersonville developed between 1908 and 1952. It includes notable examples of Queen Anne, American Foursquare, and Bungalow / American Craftsman residential architecture.  Located in the district is the contributing Spring Street Bridge (1930) and the City Ice & Storage Company Building (1915).

It was listed on the National Register of Historic Places in 2002.

Gallery

References

Historic districts on the National Register of Historic Places in North Carolina
Queen Anne architecture in North Carolina
Buildings and structures in Henderson County, North Carolina
National Register of Historic Places in Henderson County, North Carolina
Hendersonville, North Carolina